William Irigoyen (9 February 1970, Villecresnes in Val-de-Marne) is a French journalist working for the TV channel Arte.

Parcours 
After studying German and journalism at CELSA Paris, William Irigoyen became editor-reporter for France 2 and France 3, both channels of the France Télévisions group. 

He also produced reports for the monthly Grand Reportage. In 1998, he joined the editorial staff of France 2, where he was a journalist-reporter for two years.

In 2001, he left France 2 for the Franco-German cultural channel Arte, where he presented for ten years Arte Info, which later became  each evening of the week at 19:45, alternating with the German journalist .

External links 
 William Irigoyen : “J’en ai assez du robinet à eau tiède des JT” on Télérama (17 November 2014)
 William Irigoyen, l'info sans frontières on Le Monde (25 January 2010)
 William Irigoyen: l'homme qui veut jeter le JT on RFI
 Le poing et la plume, William Irigoyen's blog devoted to cultural news on the official website of Arte
 William Irigoyen on Télé sphère

1970 births
20th-century French journalists
21st-century French journalists
French television presenters
French television journalists
People from Villecresnes
Living people